Livingston Designer Outlet is the largest outlet mall in Scotland, and opened in October 2000 under the ownership of McArthur Glen as McArthur Glen Livingston Designer Outlet and sits opposite the popular The Centre (Livingston) shopping centre. The glass roof reminiscent of the Crystal Palace was designed by an architect called Don Hisaka.

In August 2013 the complex was renamed to 'Livingston Designer Outlet' as the site was sold to LaSalle Investment Management. It is currently undergoing a huge makeover in which the company has invested several million pounds.

Stores

The outlet has around 100 stores which include: Adidas, Clarks Outlet, Calvin Klein (fashion house), Tommy Hilfiger (company), Lindt Chocolate Store, Next Clearance, Nike, Ted Baker, Gap Outlet, Marks & Spencer Outlet and many more.

The outlet also contains an upper floor with a Vue cinema which contains 8 screens, a Mini golf course with two 18 holes. A large food court is also located on the upper level with many fast food outlets such as McDonald's and Subway, as well as traditional stalls like Spud u like. Many restaurants are also nearby such as Prezzo, Pizza Hut, Pizza Express and Hot Flame World Banquet.

References

External links
 Livingston Designer Outlet website

Shopping centres in Scotland
Outlet malls in Scotland
Tourist attractions in West Lothian
Buildings and structures in West Lothian
Shopping malls established in 2000